Vylathur is a village in Thrissur district in Kerala state in south India, close to Guruvayoor. The commercial town of Kunnamkulam is also a few minutes drive. The post office which serves the place is Nhamanghat (Pin Code 679563).

Vylathur is a multi-religion centre. The St. Cyriac's Church is famous for its festival of St Cyriac and St Sebastian. Sri Thrikkanamukku Siva temple is famous for the Sivarathri festival.

The commercial centre of this place is Nayarangadi.

Assembly constituency is Guruvayoor and parliament constituency is Thrissur and belongs to Vadakkekad panchayath.

Education
 St. Francis U P school
 Sacred Heart L P school
 A. L. P. School
 A. M. L. P. School

Few other parallel institutions also running here

Banks
 Catholic Syrian Bank Ltd
 South Indian Bank Ltd

Transport
Vylathur is connected by bus operating from Kunnamkulam and Guruvayoor to Ponnani via Althara. The nearest railway station is Guruvayoor. Thrissur railway station is 30km away from Vylathur. Cochin International Airport and Calicut Airport are equidistant from here.

Agriculture
The main agricultural revenue is from coconut. Paddy fields also are part of the agriculture.

References

Villages in Thrissur district
Guruvayur